Xylota abiens  is a European species of hoverfly.

Description
External images
For terms see Morphology of Diptera
The wing length is 6-8·25 mm. Abdomen black with yellow squarish spots. Thorax (dorsum) completely) pale haired and shining without bloom. Hind tibia darkened except at base.
See references for determination.

Distribution
Palearctic. Denmark South to the Pyrenees. Ireland East through Central Europe, northern Italy and Yugoslavia into Russia and the Caucasus and on as far as the Russian Far East and the Pacific coast.

References

Diptera of Europe
Taxa named by Johann Wilhelm Meigen
Eristalinae
Insects described in 1822